Jackie Cockle (born 1950) is a British stop motion animation specialist, best known as the co-founder of the HOT Animation studio, which specializes in stop motion animation. She is the creator and creative producer of the pre-school animation Timmy Time, creative producer of Bob the Builder and Brambly Hedge, director of The Wind in the Willows and more. Cockle, a graduate of the Manchester College of Art and Design, has won 3 BAFTA awards: one in the best animation category for Bob the Builder 30 minute special (2002), and two in the pre-school animation for Timmy Time (2010, 2013) - a production of the Bristol-based Aardman Animations.

Career history

Jackie Cockle has participated in many stop frame productions during her 40-year-long career. In 1976, she became a part of Cosgrove Hall Films, where she produced and directed many shows for over 20 years, including:
 Chorlton and the Wheelies (animator)
 Cinderella (animator)
 Cockleshell Bay (director)
 A Tale Of Two Toads (director)
 Oh, Mr. Toad (director)
 The Wind in the Willows (director)
 Truckers
 Noddy's Toyland Adventures (BBC)
 Oakie Doke
 Brambly Hedge
 Animal Shelf
 Rocky and the Dodos

In 1998, Cockle co-established HOT Animation as a subsidiary of HIT Entertainment, where she produced 210 10-minute episodes and 8 45-minute specials of Bob the Builder. In addition, from 1998 to 2006, she produced and was the supervising director of episodes 5-8 of Brambly Hedge, Rubbadubbers, and Pingu.

References

External links

 

British animators
British television directors
British animated film directors
British women animators
British women film directors
BAFTA winners (people)
1950 births
Living people
British women television directors